Himal Sagar (Name at Birth: Himal Gautam) is a Nepalese pop and modern singer, music composer and lyricist. Born in Jhapa, he started his singing at the early age of 11 covering songs of noted Bollywood singers – Kumar Sanu, Udit Narayan and Sonu Nigam to name a few.

He released his first original music album ‘Relation’ in September 2003. Of the 8 songs in the album, ‘Na Maile Lekhe, Na Unle Lekhin’ was one of the massive hits of that year. Since then, he has released 7 solo music albums whilst working on various collection albums as singer, songwriter and composer.

Early life 

Himal was born in Eastern region of Nepal – Baniyani – 4, Jhapa. He completed his School Leaving Certificate from Shree Laxmi Ma. Vi., Baniyai-4, Jhapa. He continued his further education in Mechi Multiple Campus, Bhadrapur, Jhapa affiliated to Tribhuvan University. He is one of 7 siblings and the only one to involve in music. His father worked as a teacher in local school while his mother was active in social works. Despite heavy influence of academicians in his family, his interest drove him to opt a career in Music.

As a child, he loved solace and would create beats from table, chairs, kitchen utensil and would indulge in music. Despite slight resistance from his family, he created his first album 'Relation' which was widely accepted in the market, selling above 70,000 audio cassettes. Slowly, his family began to understand and appreciate his works and he says that his family has been supporting him. He did a brief course in Classical Music with Santa Bahadur Gautam in Kathmandu. He recorded his first song 'Chandrama Jhai Muhar Timro' at Digital Kathmandu Recording Studio, Kathmandu in March 2003.

Discography 
 Relation (2003)
 For You (2006)
 Tyo Din (2008)
Tell Me (2011)
Last Love (2012, compilation)
 Kahani (2013)
True Love (2013, compilation)
Fulee (2014)
24 Oct (2016)
Timro Choli ko Tunama (2017) – Solo Track
I am Sorry (2017) – Solo Track
Maya Ta (2017) – Solo Track
Bhanne Garthe (2018) – Solo Track
Parkhina Garo Bho (2018) – Solo Track
Baja (2018) – Solo Track
Kafal Ko Danaa (2019) – Solo Track
A Maya (2019) – Solo Track

Awards
Kalika Music Award (2009) – Best Vocal Performance of the year Male Pop: Song – Mero Man ma aago laune ko

Machhapuchhre FM Dhuk Dhuki Pop Award (2004) – Song of the year Male Pop: Song – Na Maile Lekhe

The best pop music composition for the song “Timro Choliko Tunama” in Kalika FM music award 2017 

2nd young Mind Entertainment award, best pop singer Male of the year 2019 for the song Baja.

Philanthropy
Himal Sagar has participated in various social activities so as to generate fund for various causes. Notably, a fund raiser to build 1000 homes for those displaced due to the Nepal Earthquake of 2015 organized by NRNA Oman in the occasion of New Year 2016. Similarly, he also performed in charity event in Cyprus. In addition, he also donated various stationary materials to the differently-abled children at Aapanga Baal Sikshya Sarokar Kendra in the year 2017.

References

Living people
1980 births
21st-century Nepalese male singers
Nepalese composers
Nepalese lyricists
People from Jhapa District